Everett De Roche (July 12, 1946 - April 2, 2014) was an American-Australian screenwriter who worked extensively in the Australian film and TV industry. He was best known for his work in the thriller and horror genre, with such credits as Long Weekend, Patrick and Roadgames.

Career
De Roche was born in Lincoln, Maine and moved to San Diego with his family when he was six. De Roche emigrated to Australia with his wife when he was 22 in 1968 and originally worked as a journalist for the Queensland Health Education Council.

He wanted to be a writer and wrote a spec script for Division Four. Nine months later he received a telegram inviting him to write for the show. From 1970-74 he was a staff writer at Crawford Productions mainly working on police shows, then he freelanced.

In the late 70s and early 80s he established himself as the leading screenwriter of thrillers in Australia.

He often worked with director Richard Franklin who said of him:
Everett is a very inspirational writer... Everett gives one too much of everything and you don’t always know what to use. You start editing down and you end up with words and single lines of dialogue that were once scenes. That is maybe how this problem, as you see it, comes about. But that only has to do with Everett’s extraordinarily fertile imagination and his writing speed.

Death
De Roche had cancer during the last three years of his life and died of the disease in 2014. He was survived by his wife, six daughters and several grandchildren.

Select credits
Patrick (1978)
Long Weekend (1978)
Snapshot (1979)
Harlequin (1980)
Roadgames (1981)
Race for the Yankee Zephyr (1981)
Razorback (1984)
Fortress (1985)
Frog Dreaming (1985)
Link (1986)
Windrider (1986)
Stingers (TV series) (1998-2001)
Visitors (2003)
Storm Warning (2007)
Long Weekend (2008)
Nine Miles Down (2009)

Television 
Homicide
Division 4
Matlock Police
Moon Monkey (1972)
Fibber, the Dancing Galah (1972)
Three-Legged Duck (1972)
Ryan
Bedlam (1973)
Poppy and the Closet Junkie (1973)
A Song for Julie (1973)
Little Raver (1974)
The Curse of the Bangerang (1975)
My Bonnie My Bonny (1975)
Scout's Honour (1975)
Bluey (1976)
Tandarra (1976)
Solo One (1976)
The Mooball Man (1976)
The Hydra (1976)
Chopper Squad (1978) – pilot
Skyways (1979)
Locusts and Wild Honey (1980)
Special Squad (1984)
All the Way (1988)
Police Rescue (1989) – pilot
Bony (1990) - TV movie
The Flying Doctors (1991)
Halfway Across the Galaxy and Turn Left (1992)
R.F.D.S. (1993)
Secrets (1993)
Blue Heelers (1994)
Snowy River: The McGregor Saga (1994–95)
Flipper (1995)
Ship to Shore (1993–96)
Fire (1995–96)
The Feds: Seduction (1993)
Medivac (1996–97)
Good Guys, Bad Guys (1997–98)
Ocean Girl (1997)
Thunderstone (1999)
Stingers (1998–2001)
Something in the Air (2000–01)
Cybergirl (2001)
The Saddle Club (2003)
Parallax (2004) – 4 episodes
Two Twisted (2006) – episode "A Date with Doctor D"
K-9 (2009) – episode "Alien Avatar"

Unmade projects
Firestorm (circa 1984) - film about bushfires in Mornington Peninsula that was to mark his directorial debut. The budget was given at $6 million.
Breakwater (early 1990s) - a science fiction adventure story set around Half Moon Bay's hulk of the Cerberus with director Richard Franklin
Making Noises (2010) - co-writer
High Seas (2010) - a pirate film

Accolades
In 2014, Everett DeRoche was posthumously awarded the Dorothy Crawford Award for Outstanding Contribution to the Profession. During his career he also received nominations for two AFI Awards; one for Best Adapted Screenplay for Razorback and one for Best Original Screenplay for Patrick. He didn't win either one of those awards.

References

External links

Everett de Roche at AustLit
1980 interview at Senses of Cinema

American male screenwriters
1946 births
2014 deaths